The Great British Beer Festival (sometimes abbreviated as GBBF) is an annual beer festival organised by the Campaign for Real Ale (CAMRA). It presents a selection of cask ales, and the Champion Beer of Britain awards, and is held in August of each year. GBBF's sister festival, the Great British Beer Festival Winter, is held in February each year.

Description 

Great British Beer Festival is styled as the "biggest pub in the world" and offers around 900 different beverages, at least 450 of which are beers from British breweries, as well as around 200 foreign beers from countries including Belgium, Germany and the USA, as well traditional British cider and perry. The festival is staffed by unpaid volunteers, around 1000 of whom work at the festival.

The festival is usually held during the first full week in August and runs from Tuesday to Saturday. The Tuesday afternoon session is only open to the trade and press, with the Champion Beer of Britain award winners being announced mid-afternoon. The general public are admitted to afternoon and evening sessions from Tuesday evening until Saturday evening. CAMRA figures show that in 2006, over 66,000 people visited the festival over the course of the week and consumed some 350,000 pints of beer — one pint sold in less than half of every open second. Part of the huge improvement on 2005 (ticket sales were up 40%) was attributed by the festival organiser, Marc Holmes, to the move from Olympia to Earls Court, a much larger and easily  accessible venue. Since 2012 the event has returned to Olympia and remains massively popular.

As well as the beer, the festival offers entertainment such as live music and traditional pub games, as well as a variety of food stands.

Event history 

CAMRA held their first large beer festival in Covent Garden, London in September 1975. It was a 4-day event that attracted 40,000 people who drank 150,000 pints of real ale. Strictly speaking it was not a GBBF, but it has been considered the forerunner of the festival. The first "proper" GBBF was held in 1977 at Alexandra Palace.  The venue has moved between cities since it was first established but has settled in London since 1991.  The only years in which a festival was not held were 1984, 2020 and 2021, due to a fire at the venue and the COVID-19 pandemic respectively.

 1977: Alexandra Palace, London
 1978: Alexandra Palace, London
 1979: Alexandra Palace, London
 1980: Alexandra Palace, London (in tents after the Palace burnt down)
 1981: Queens Hall, Leeds. Great British Beer Festival held outside London for the first time.
 1982: Queens Hall, Leeds
 1983: Bingley Hall, Birmingham
 1984: No event
 1985: Metropole, Brighton
 1986: Metropole, Brighton
 1987: Metropole, Brighton
 1988: Queens Hall, Leeds
 1989: Queens Hall, Leeds
 1990: Metropole, Brighton
 1991: Docklands Arena, London
 1992: Olympia, London
 1993: Olympia, London
 1994: Olympia, London
 1995: Olympia, London
 1996: Olympia, London
 1997: Olympia, London
 1998: Olympia, London
 1999: Olympia, London
 2000: Olympia, London
 2001: Olympia, London
 2002: Olympia, London
 2003: Olympia, London
 2004: Olympia, London
 2005: Olympia, London
 2006: Earls Court, London
 2007: Earls Court, London Celebrated as the 30th Anniversary of the festival
 2008: Earls Court, London
 2009: Earls Court, London
 2010: Earls Court, London 66,900 people attended
 2011: Earls Court, London 62,446 people attended
 2012: Olympia, London
 2013: Olympia, London
 2014: Olympia, London 
 2015: Olympia, London
 2016: Olympia, London
 2017: Olympia, London
 2018: Olympia, London
 2019: Olympia, London
 2020: Olympia, London Cancelled due to COVID-19 pandemic
 2021: Olympia, London Cancelled due to COVID-19 pandemic
 2022: Olympia, London

References

External links 

 GBBF website
 CAMRA, the Campaign for Real Ale
 Festival of Beer: Search for Beer Festivals around the World
 GBBF for tourists

Beer festivals in the United Kingdom
Annual events in the United Kingdom
1977 establishments in the United Kingdom
Recurring events established in 1977
Alexandra Palace